Lassi Lappalainen (born 24 August 1998) is a Finnish professional footballer who plays as a winger for Major League Soccer club CF Montréal. He also represents the Finland national team.

Club career

Early career
Born in Espoo in 1998, Lappalainen started his football career with Espoon palloseura (EPS) and later moved to HJK youth team. Lappalainen played in Klubi 04, the reserve team of HJK.

HJK
In 2016, Lappalainen was called up for HJK's first team. On 2 April 2016, he made his Veikkausliiga debut against IFK Mariehamn at Sonera Stadium, being substituted on by coach Mika Lehkosuo in place of Nnamdi Oduamadi in the 90th minute.

On 21 July 2017, Lappalainen was loaned to RoPS for remainder of the Veikkausliiga season. Two days later, he scored his first league goal for RoPS just five minutes into his debut after coming on as a substitute.

Bologna
On 19 July 2019, Lappalainen signed to Italian Serie A club Bologna. HJK Helsinki stated it received "significant compensation" and that economically, the transfer was in the "top 7 of HJK's club history".

Montreal
On 25 July 2019, it was announced that Lappalainen was loaned to Major League Soccer (MLS) club Montreal Impact, later renamed as CF Montréal, for the remainder of the 2019 season using Targeted Allocation Money. The Impact have options to extend the loan until 30 June 2020, as well as until 31 December 2020. On 27 July 2019, he contributed two goals to Montreal Impact's 4–0 victory over the first-place Philadelphia Union on his Major League Soccer debut.

On 3 December 2021, Lappalainen's move to Montréal was made permanent.

International career
Lappalainen made his debut for the Finland national team on 8 January 2019 in a friendly against Sweden, as a starter.

Lappalainen was called up for the UEFA Euro 2020 pre-tournament friendly match against Sweden on 29 May 2021.

Career statistics

Club

International

Honours
Montreal Impact
Canadian Championship: 2019 2021

Notes

References

External links

Living people
1998 births
People from Espoo
Association football forwards
Finnish footballers
Finland youth international footballers
Finland under-21 international footballers
Finland international footballers
Helsingin Jalkapalloklubi players
Klubi 04 players
Rovaniemen Palloseura players
Bologna F.C. 1909 players
CF Montréal players
Veikkausliiga players
Kakkonen players
Major League Soccer players
UEFA Euro 2020 players
Finnish expatriate footballers
Finnish expatriate sportspeople in Canada
Expatriate soccer players in Canada